The 2017 FIBA Asia Champions Cup was the 26th staging of the FIBA Asia Champions Cup, the international basketball club tournament of FIBA Asia. The tournament took place in Chenzhou, China from 22 September to 30 September 2017. This was the second straight year that China hosted the tournament.

Qualification
According to the FIBA Asia rules, the number of participating teams in the FIBA Asia Champions Cup is ten. Each of the six FIBA Asia Sub-Zones has one place, and the hosts (China) was automatically qualified. The other three places are allocated to the zones according to performance in the 2016 FIBA Asia Champions Cup.

West Asia
On March 17, 2017, Al-Riyadi of Lebanon ruled the West Asia Basketball Association (WABA) Champions Cup for the fourth time in their history after beating defending champions Petrochimi of Iran, 83-69, in the Final in Amman, Jordan. Joining the finalists is the first-time participants Sareyyet Ramallah of Palestine, which qualified by virtue of their win over Iraq's Al Mina the day before.

Southeast Asia
On April 23, 2017, Mono Vampire of Thailand qualified to the main tournament by being the champion of TBSL (Thailand Basketball Super League).

Singapore Slingers, who was the runner-up in the ASEAN Basketball League in 2017, was supposed to play in the tournament, but apparently withdrew due to the 2017 Southeast Asian Games.

Chooks-to-Go Pilipinas were given a wildcard slot on September 5, as a replacement to Japan's SunRockers Shibuya. SunRockers Shibuya withdrew their participation due to scheduling conflicts with the B.League.

Persian Gulf
The 37th GCC Club Basketball Championship was held from May 12 up to May 20, 2017 in Manama, Bahrain. United Arab Emirates' Al-Ahli defeated their compatriots Al Shabab in the final. Joining the champions is the Manama Club of Bahrain, who took the bronze medal by defeating Al-Rayyan of Qatar. 
Eight teams vied for the two slots allotted for Persian Gulf Region. The draw for the tournament was held on April 7, 2017.

South Asia
The 2017 SABA Championship, which is also the qualifying tournament for the 2017 FIBA Asia Cup and 2019 FIBA Basketball World Cup Asian Qualifiers, was also designated as the qualifying tournament for SABA subzone for the 2017 FIBA Asia Champions Cup. Since  won the tournament, their top domestic club will also represent South Asia,  which means that the defending Indian champs ONGC will represent India and South Asia.

Draw
The draw was held in Beijing on 25 August 2017. Three pots used for the draw. All ten teams except China's representative where distributed among the pots according to their geographical locations. The Chinese representative chose the group which they would like to be in. The identity of the Japanese team which later withdrew were not yet announced at the time of the draw.

(*) Identity unknown at the time of draw, later announced as Sun Rockers Shibuya. The team withdrew from the tournament and was replaced by Chooks-to-Go Pilipinas of the Philippines.

Preliminary round

All times are local (UTC+8).

Group A

Group B

Final round

Quarterfinals

Classification 5th–8th

Semifinals

Seventh place game

Fifth place game

Third place game

Final

Final ranking

Awards

All-Star Five

References

2017
Champions Cup
Champions Cup
International basketball competitions hosted by China
FIBA Asia Champions Cup